Jason Michael (born October 15, 1978) is an American football coach who is the tight ends coach for the Philadelphia Eagles of the National Football League (NFL). He previously served as an assistant coach for the Indianapolis Colts, Arizona Cardinals, Tennessee Titans, San Diego Chargers, San Francisco 49ers, New York Jets and Oakland Raiders.

Playing career

College
Michael played quarterback for Jack Harbaugh at Western Kentucky after transferring from Army. He was the quarterback of the 2002 Division I-AA National Championship team. Michael was named the school’s Male Athlete of the Year in 2003. He graduated with a degree in civil engineering technology with a perfect 4.0 G.P.A. and was named a I-AA Athletic Directors Academic All-Star and a second-team Verizon Academic All-District IV honoree.

Coaching career

Tennessee Volunteers

In 2003, Michael began his coaching career as a graduate assistant for the Tennessee Volunteers football team at the University of Tennessee, where he assisted with the secondary and special teams for two seasons.

Oakland Raiders

In 2005, Michael was hired as a video assistant and offensive quality control coach for the Oakland Raiders.

New York Jets
Michael then was hired as an offensive quality control coach for the New York Jets in 2006. In 2007, he was promoted to tight ends coach.

Return to Tennessee

Michael returned to the University of Tennessee to coach the tight ends in 2008, in Phillip Fulmer’s final season.

San Francisco 49ers
In 2009, Michael was hired by the San Francisco 49ers as an offensive assistant and quarterbacks coach .

San Diego Chargers
Michael was hired by the San Diego Chargers as the tight ends coach in 2011.

Tennessee Titans

On January 17, 2014, Michael was hired by the Tennessee Titans as their offensive coordinator under head coach Mike Mularkey. He moved to quarterbacks coach in 2016.

Arizona Cardinals
On February 14, 2018, Michael was hired by the Arizona Cardinals as their tight ends coach under head coach Steve Wilks.

Indianapolis Colts
On January 29, 2019, Michael was hired by the Indianapolis Colts as their tight ends coach under head coach Frank Reich.

Philadelphia Eagles
On January 27, 2021, Michael was hired by the Philadelphia Eagles as their tight ends coach under head coach Nick Sirianni. Michael and Sirianni worked together in Indianapolis.

Personal life
Michael and his wife, Jamie, have one son, Wyatt, and a daughter, Charlie.

References

External links
 Indianapolis Colts profile

1978 births
Living people
Tennessee Titans coaches
National Football League offensive coordinators
People from Louisa, Kentucky
Players of American football from Kentucky
Western Kentucky Hilltoppers football players
Arizona Cardinals coaches
Philadelphia Eagles coaches
Indianapolis Colts coaches
Oakland Raiders coaches
San Diego Chargers coaches
San Francisco 49ers coaches
New York Jets coaches